Jack Stratton (born 21 August 1994) is a New Zealand rugby union player who plays for the  in the Super Rugby competition.  His position of choice is scrum-half.

References 

New Zealand rugby union players
1994 births
Living people
Rugby union scrum-halves
Canterbury rugby union players
Crusaders (rugby union) players
Waikato rugby union players
Toshiba Brave Lupus Tokyo players
Rugby union players from Manawatū-Whanganui